Jacqueline Akhavan is a British chemist and expert in the chemistry of explosives.

Early life and education 
Akhavan grew up in a house in Bermondsey, South London where there was an outdoor toilet and a tin bath. of postdoctoral research, she decided that her future lay in academia. She was then advised against going directly into a university career. She was instead told by her PhD advisor to go into the industry, as experience in industry would help her gain an understanding of the commercial environment. This advice helped her move back into academia once she decided to become a lecturer. After graduating, she began working at Pirelli General developing polymeric optical fibers for communication. She worked at Pirelli for 3 years when she went back into academia by joining Cranfield University as a polymer and physical chemistry lecturer. She also received her master's degree in Philosophy in 1982 and her PhD in polymer chemistry from Southampton University.

Academic career
At Cranfield, she first started her work using the explosives in fireworks by understanding the reactions taking place as well as making them safe for the public to use. Eventually, she was promoted to senior lecturer at Cranfield and became the head of the Centre for Defense Chemistry. Her research also is focused on polymer bonded explosives and their applications. During her tenure, she has received numerous research contracts from government organization, such as the Ministry of Defense UK, and also various corporate contracts from companies such as BAe Systems and MBDA. Most of her work, however, is secret due to the nature of her work and the application of her research will never be published.   In 2007, she was given a chair in explosive chemistry and is now the Head of the Center for Defense Chemistry. As of September 2014, her current research is focused on making it easier for government agencies to detect explosives during security screenings like the ones conducted at airports. The main focus of this new research is developing viable ways to detect liquid and paste explosives.  Akhavan also helps to train government agencies in bomb recognition and detection to improve safety.

She is both a Fellow of the Royal Society of Chemistry and the Institute of Explosive Engineers. She is also a member of the Board of trustees for the Explosives Engineers Educational and Research Trust, where she helps to promote a safe and professional work environment for employees working with explosives.

Personal life 
As a researcher, she finds her work to be both challenging and rewarding. This also extends to her teaching career as she enjoys teaching both undergraduates and postgraduates.

Akhavan also states that her career has its, though exciting and gratifying, has its drawbacks. Most notably, she states that the worst aspect of her career is how it impacts her family life. Her career has forced her to spend holidays away from her family. She elaborates by stating that if not for her husband Shari's constant support and sacrifice, she may not have gotten as far in her career as she currently has.

She has stated that outside of chemistry she spends most of her free time cooking in her kitchen and sitting on her couch and reading.

She highly recommends that people to go into chemistry careers, but also warns them to be ready to stop viewing the world like other people and to accept chemistry as part of their everyday lives. She also advises people looking to go into careers in academia not to expect to be rich. However, she then says that this work provides a strong sense of fulfillment and achievement. As she puts it, it is a way of life.

Notable Quotes 
 When asked about the ethics of worthing with Missiles, Mortars, and IEDs, she said “We don’t make any of those but look at making the explosives inside them safer to manufacture and safer for the user.” 
 “A lot of the work we do now is about detecting liquid explosives at airports. It has changed and is [now] all about protecting the people of this country" 
 “Your fusing system, you would have a prime explosive in there which, generally speaking, would contain lead azide which is very sensitive.  And then your main charge will be a combination of TNT, tri-nitrotoluene, with RDX.”

The Chemistry of Explosives 
Akhavan published a book called The Chemistry of Explosives. This book covered many different aspects of explosives including the classification of explosives, combustion, ignition, thermochemistry, and kinetics. Also, there is an introduction to explosives at the beginning of the book that goes over the development of most of the notable explosives used today. The book is meant to teach others about the science behind explosive compounds.

Notable work 
Akhavan has led research for: 
 United Kingdom Ministry of Defense
 BAE Systems
 Chemring - Provides aerospace, security, and defense products.
 MBDA
 SPEX
 Roxel
 SAFEX
 Pirelli General R&D
 Leonardo da Vinci Eu Programme - To produce a well-trained workforce for all of Europe.
 Head of Center for Defense Chemistry
 Bloodhound - A Project to design a supersonic land vehicle.

References

External links 

 

English chemists
People from Bermondsey
Scientists from London
Alumni of the University of Southampton
Academics of Cranfield University
Living people
Fellows of the Royal Society of Chemistry
Year of birth missing (living people)